Emily Goodsir (born 17 June 1992) is an Australian rules footballer who plays for Greater Western Sydney in the AFL Women's league.

References

External links

 

Living people
1992 births
Greater Western Sydney Giants (AFLW) players
Australian rules footballers from New South Wales
Sportswomen from New South Wales